Samuel Kini is a Papua New Guinean football player. Currently a member of Madang in the Papua New Guinea National Soccer League. He has made 5 appearances for the Papua New Guinea national football team.

International career

International goals
Scores and results list Papua New Guinea's goal tally first.

References

1987 births
Living people
Papua New Guinean footballers
Papua New Guinea international footballers
Association football midfielders
2012 OFC Nations Cup players